DAPT is a chemical compound used in the study of the Notch signaling pathway.  DAPT is a γ-secretase inhibitor.  It indirectly inhibits Notch, which is a substrate for γ-secretase.

In a mouse model of Alzheimer's disease, DAPT reduces the levels of beta-amyloid.

References

Enzyme inhibitors
Fluoroarenes
Dipeptides
Gamma secretase inhibitors